The silver-tipped imperial pigeon (Ducula luctuosa), also known as the white-tipped imperial-pigeon, is a relatively large species of bird in the family Columbidae. It is endemic to forest, woodland and mangrove on Sulawesi and smaller nearby islands.

Description 
It has sometimes been considered a subspecies of the pied imperial pigeon, but has a yellowish tip to the bill, black spotting near the vent, and silvery-grey remiges.

References

silver-tipped imperial pigeon
Birds of Sulawesi
silver-tipped imperial pigeon
Taxonomy articles created by Polbot